Prayer has a long history as a means of protesting injustices, appealing both to God to intervene and enact justice in the situation, and to political opponents to rise to a superior moral position. Boston declared a day of fasting and prayer in September 1768 as a protest against a British plan to station troops in the city. The Colony of Virginia's House of Burgesses established a day of fasting and prayer to take place on Wednesday, June 1, 1774, to protest the Boston Port Act. Thomas Jefferson found this to remarkably effecting, writing that "the effect of the day through the whole colony was like a shock of electricity," moving the Virginians to choose delegates to establish self-rule.

A. Philip Randolph pioneered the use of prayer protests as a tactic of the civil rights movement. A "pray-in" is now a recognized tactic of nonviolent protest combining the practices of prayer and a sit-in.

More recently, Christian leaders have publicly prayed for corporate executives in an effort to change their decisions regarding employee pay.

References

Civil disobedience
History of African-American civil rights
Nonviolent occupation
Nonviolent resistance movements
Protest tactics
Prayer
Spiritual practice